Igor Strelkov may refer to:

 Igor Strelkov (footballer) (born 1982), Russian footballer
 Igor Girkin (born 1970), Russian military commander nicknamed "Strelkov"